The Montreal Quebec Temple is the 86th operating temple of the Church of Jesus Christ of Latter-day Saints (LDS Church).

History
The temple was announced on August 6, 1998, and was the sixth temple to be built in Canada. It was also one of the temples announced with a long list of others, which LDS Church president Gordon B. Hinckley hoped to have completed by the end of 2000 in order to have 100 operating temples throughout the world.

Gary J. Coleman, of the Seventy, presided at a site dedication and groundbreaking ceremony held on April 9, 1999. The temple sits on a  plot in the city of Longueuil. The temple was open to the public for tours of the interior May 20–27, 2000. Despite the short duration of the open house, more than 10,000 people toured the temple.

Hinckley dedicated the Montreal Quebec Temple on June 4, 2000. Before the dedication began, a cornerstone ceremony was held to officially complete the construction of the temple. Hinckley placed the cornerstone and had help from local children in placing the mortar. Around 6,000 members attended the four dedicatory sessions of the temple. The temple serves more than 12,200 church members from the Montréal; Ottawa, Ontario; Montpelier, Vermont; and upstate New York areas.

The exterior finish is made of Bethel white granite from northern Vermont.

The temple closed for renovations in 2014.  A public open house was held from Thursday, 5 November 2015, through Saturday, 14 November 2015, excluding Sunday.  The temple was rededicated on Sunday, November 22, 2015, by Henry B. Eyring.

In 2020, the Montreal Quebec Temple was closed in response to the coronavirus pandemic.

Gallery

See also

 Comparison of temples of The Church of Jesus Christ of Latter-day Saints
 List of temples of The Church of Jesus Christ of Latter-day Saints
 List of temples of The Church of Jesus Christ of Latter-day Saints by geographic region
 Temple architecture (Latter-day Saints)
 The Church of Jesus Christ of Latter-day Saints in Canada

References

Additional reading

External links
 
 Montreal Quebec Temple Official site
 Montreal Quebec Temple at ChurchofJesusChristTemples.org

20th-century Latter Day Saint temples
Buildings and structures in Longueuil
Religious buildings and structures in Quebec
Temples (LDS Church) completed in 2000
Temples (LDS Church) in Canada
2000 establishments in Quebec
20th-century religious buildings and structures in Canada
21st-century religious buildings and structures in Canada